Poshtjin (also Romanized as Poshtjīn; also known as Posht Chīn, Poshteh Jīn, and Pusht-i-Jin) is a village in Darjazin-e Sofla Rural District, Qorveh-e Darjazin District, Razan County, Hamadan Province, Iran. At the 2006 census, its population was 1,092, in 273 families.

References 

Populated places in Razan County